Lobsters are a family (Nephropidae, synonym Homaridae) of marine crustaceans. They have long bodies with muscular tails and live in crevices or burrows on the sea floor. Three of their five pairs of legs have claws, including the first pair, which are usually much larger than the others. Highly prized as seafood, lobsters are economically important and are often one of the most profitable commodities in the coastal areas they populate.

Commercially important species include two species of Homarus from the northern Atlantic Ocean and scampi (which look more like a shrimp, or a "mini lobster")—the Northern Hemisphere genus Nephrops and the Southern Hemisphere genus Metanephrops.

Distinction 
Although several other groups of crustaceans have the word "lobster" in their names, the unqualified term "lobster" generally refers to the clawed lobsters of the family Nephropidae. Clawed lobsters are not closely related to spiny lobsters or slipper lobsters, which have no claws (chelae), or to squat lobsters. The most similar living relatives of clawed lobsters are the reef lobsters and the three families of freshwater crayfish.

Description

Body 

Lobsters are invertebrates with a hard protective exoskeleton. Like most arthropods, lobsters must shed to grow, which leaves them vulnerable. During the shedding process, several species change color. Lobsters have eight walking legs; the front three pairs bear claws, the first of which are larger than the others. The front pincers are also biologically considered legs, so they belong in the order Decapods ("ten-footed"). Although lobsters are largely bilaterally symmetrical like most other arthropods, some genera possess unequal, specialized claws.

Lobster anatomy includes two main body parts: the cephalothorax and the abdomen. The cephalothorax fuses the head and the thorax, both of which are covered by a chitinous carapace. The lobster's head bears antennae, antennules, mandibles, the first and second maxillae. The head also bears the (usually stalked) compound eyes. Because lobsters live in murky environments at the bottom of the ocean, they mostly use their antennae as sensors. The lobster eye has a reflective structure above a convex retina. In contrast, most complex eyes use refractive ray concentrators (lenses) and a concave retina. The lobster's thorax is composed of maxillipeds, appendages that function primarily as mouthparts, and pereiopods, appendages that serve for walking and for gathering food. The abdomen includes pleopods (also known as swimmerets), used for swimming, as well as the tail fan, composed of uropods and the telson.

Lobsters, like snails and spiders, have blue blood due to the presence of hemocyanin, which contains copper. In contrast, vertebrates, and many other animals have red blood from iron-rich hemoglobin. Lobsters possess a green hepatopancreas, called the tomalley by chefs, which functions as the animal's liver and pancreas.

Lobsters of the family Nephropidae are similar in overall form to several other related groups. They differ from freshwater crayfish in lacking the joint between the last two segments of the thorax, and they differ from the reef lobsters of the family Enoplometopidae in having full claws on the first three pairs of legs, rather than just one. The distinctions from fossil families such as the Chilenophoberidae are based on the pattern of grooves on the carapace.

Analysis of the neural gene complement revealed extraordinary development of the chemosensory machinery, including a profound diversification of ligand-gated ion channels and secretory molecules.

Coloring 
Typically, lobsters are dark colored, either bluish-green or greenish-brown, to blend in with the ocean floor, but they can be found in many colors. Lobsters with atypical coloring are extremely rare, accounting for only a few of the millions caught every year, and due to their rarity, they usually are not eaten, instead being released back into the wild or donated to aquariums. Often, in cases of atypical coloring, there is a genetic factor, such as albinism or hermaphroditism. Special coloring does not appear to affect the lobster's taste once cooked; except for albinos, all lobsters possess astaxanthin, which is responsible for the bright red color lobsters turn after being cooked.

Longevity 
Lobsters live up to an estimated 45 to 50 years in the wild, although determining age is difficult: it is typically estimated from size and other variables. Newer techniques may lead to more accurate age estimates.

Research suggests that lobsters may not slow down, weaken or lose fertility with age and that older lobsters may be more fertile than younger. This longevity may be due to telomerase, an enzyme that repairs long repetitive sections of DNA sequences at the ends of chromosomes, referred to as telomeres. Telomerase is expressed by most vertebrates during embryonic stages but is generally absent from adult stages of life. However, unlike most vertebrates, lobsters express telomerase as adults through most tissue, which has been suggested to be related to their longevity. Telomerase is especially present in 'Green Spotted' lobsters - whose markings are thought to be produced by the enzyme interacting with their shell pigmentation. Lobster longevity is limited by their size. Moulting requires metabolic energy, and the larger the lobster, the more energy is needed; 10 to 15% of lobsters die of exhaustion during moulting, while in older lobsters, moulting ceases and the exoskeleton degrades or collapses entirely, leading to death.

Like many decapod crustaceans, lobsters grow throughout life and can add new muscle cells at each moult. Lobster longevity allows them to reach impressive sizes. According to Guinness World Records, the largest lobster ever caught was in Nova Scotia, Canada, weighing .

Ecology 
Lobsters live in all oceans, on rocky, sandy, or muddy bottoms from the shoreline to beyond the edge of the continental shelf. They generally live singly in crevices or in burrows under rocks.

Lobsters are omnivores and typically eat live prey such as fish, mollusks, other crustaceans, worms, and some plant life. They scavenge if necessary and are known to resort to cannibalism in captivity. However, when lobster skin is found in lobster stomachs, this is not necessarily evidence of cannibalism because lobsters eat their shed skin after moulting. While cannibalism was thought to be nonexistent among wild lobster populations, it was observed in 2012 by researchers studying wild lobsters in Maine. These first known instances of lobster cannibalism in the wild are theorized to be attributed to a local population explosion among lobsters caused by the disappearance of many of the Maine lobsters' natural predators.

However, they swim backward quickly when they flee by curling and uncurling their abdomens. A speed of  has been recorded. This is known as the caridoid escape reaction.

Symbiotic animals of the genus Symbion, the only known member of the phylum Cycliophora, live exclusively on lobster gills and mouthparts. Different species of Symbion have been found on the three commercially important lobsters of the North Atlantic Ocean: Nephrops norvegicus, Homarus gammarus, and Homarus americanus.

As food 

Lobster is commonly served boiled or steamed in the shell. Diners crack the shell with lobster crackers and fish out the meat with lobster picks. The meat is often eaten with melted butter and lemon juice. Lobster is also used in soup, bisque, lobster rolls, cappon magro, and dishes such as lobster Newberg and lobster Thermidor.

Cooks boil or steam live lobsters. When a lobster is cooked, its shell's color changes from blue to orange because the heat from cooking breaks down a protein called crustacyanin, which suppresses the orange hue of the chemical astaxanthin, which is also found in the shell.

According to the United States Food and Drug Administration (FDA), the mean level of mercury in American lobster between 2005 and 2007 was 0.107ppm.

History 

Humans have eaten lobster since the prehistoric period. Large piles of lobster shells near areas populated by fishing communities attest to the crustacean's extreme popularity during this period. Evidence indicates that lobster was being consumed as a regular food product in fishing communities along the shores of Britain, South Africa ~100,000 years ago, Australia, and Papua New Guinea ~35,000 years ago. Lobster became a significant source of nutrients among European coastal dwellers. Historians suggest lobster was an important secondary food source for most European coastal dwellers, and it was a primary food source for coastal communities in Britain during this time.

Lobster became a popular mid-range delicacy during the mid to late Roman period. The price of lobster could vary widely due to various factors, but evidence indicates that lobster was regularly transported inland over long distances to meet popular demand. A mosaic found in the ruins of Pompeii suggests that the spiny lobster was of considerable interest to the Roman population during the early imperial period.

Lobster was a popular food among the Moche people of Peru between 50 CE and 800 CE. Besides its use as food, lobster shells were also used to create a light pink dye, ornaments, and tools. A mass-produced lobster-shaped effigy vessel dated to this period attests to lobster's popularity at this time, though the purpose of this vessel has not been identified.

The Viking period saw an increase in lobster and other shellfish consumption among northern Europeans. This can be attributed to the overall increase in marine activity due to the development of better boats and the increasing cultural investment in building ships and training sailors. The consumption of marine life went up overall in this period, and the consumption of lobster went up in accordance with this general trend.

Unlike fish, however, lobster had to be cooked within two days of leaving salt water, limiting the availability of lobster to inland dwellers. Thus lobster, more than fish, became a food primarily available to the relatively well-off, at least among non-coastal dwellers.

Lobster is first mentioned in cookbooks during the medieval period. Le Viandier de Taillevent, a French recipe collection written around 1300, suggests that lobster (also called saltwater crayfish) be “Cooked in wine and water, or in the oven; eaten in vinegar.” Le Viandier de Taillevent is considered to be one of the first “haut cuisine” cookbooks, advising on how to cook meals that would have been quite elaborate for the period and making usage of expensive and hard to obtain ingredients. Though the original edition, which includes the recipe for lobster, was published before the birth of French court cook Guillaume Tirel, Tirel later expanded and republished this recipe collection, suggesting that the recipes included in both editions were popular among the highest circles of French nobility, including King Philip VI. The inclusion of a lobster recipe in this cookbook, especially one which does not make use of other more expensive ingredients, attests to the popularity of lobster among the wealthy.

The French household guidebook Le Ménagier de Paris, published in 1393, includes no less than five recipes, including lobster, which vary in elaboration. A guidebook intended to provide advice for women running upper-class households, Le Ménagier de Paris is similar to its predecessor in that it indicates the popularity of lobster as a food among the upper classes.

That lobster was first mentioned in cookbooks during the 1300s and only mentioned in two during this century should not be taken as an implication that lobster was not widely consumed before or during this time. Recipe collections were virtually non-existent before the 1300s, and only a handful exist from the medieval period.

During the early 1400s, lobster was still a popular dish among the upper classes. During this time, influential households used the variety and variation of species served at feasts to display wealth and prestige. Lobster was commonly found among these spreads, indicating that it continued to be held in high esteem among the wealthy. In one notable instance, the Bishop of Salisbury offered at least 42 kinds of crustaceans and fish at his feasts over nine months, including several varieties of lobster. However, lobster was not a food exclusively accessed by the wealthy. The general population living on the coasts made use of the various food sources provided by the ocean, and shellfish especially became a more popular source of nutrition. Among the general population, lobster was generally eaten boiled during the mid-15th century, but the influence of the cuisine of higher society can be seen in that it was now also regularly eaten cold with vinegar. The inland peasantry would still have generally been unfamiliar with lobster during this time.

Lobster continued to be eaten as a delicacy and a general staple food among coastal communities until the late 17th century. During this time, the influence of the Church and the government regulating and sometimes banning meat consumption during certain periods continued to encourage the popularity of seafood, especially shellfish, as a meat alternative among all classes. Throughout this period, lobster was eaten fresh, pickled, and salted. From the late 17th century onward, developments in fishing, transportation, and cooking technology allowed lobster to more easily make its way inland, and the variety of dishes involving lobster and cooking techniques used with the ingredient expanded. However, these developments coincided with a decrease in the lobster population, and lobster increasingly became a delicacy food, valued among the rich as a status symbol and less likely to be found in the diet of the general population.

The American lobster was not originally popular among European colonists in North America. This was partially due to the European inlander's association of lobster with barely edible salted seafood and partially due to a cultural opinion that seafood was a lesser alternative to meat that did not provide the taste or nutrients desired. It was also due to the extreme abundance of lobster at the time of the colonists' arrival, which contributed to a general perception of lobster as an undesirable peasant food. The American lobster did not achieve popularity until the mid-19th century when New Yorkers and Bostonians developed a taste for it, and commercial lobster fisheries only flourished after the development of the lobster smack, a custom-made boat with open holding wells on the deck to keep the lobsters alive during transport.

Before this time, lobster was considered a poverty food or as a food for indentured servants or lower members of society in Maine, Massachusetts, and the Canadian Maritimes. Some servants specified in employment agreements that they would not eat lobster more than twice per week, however there is limited evidence for this. Lobster was also commonly served in prisons, much to the displeasure of inmates. American lobster was initially deemed worthy only of being used as fertilizer or fish bait, and until well into the 20th century, it was not viewed as more than a low-priced canned staple food.

As a crustacean, lobster remains a taboo food in the dietary laws of Judaism and certain streams of Islam.

Grading 

Caught lobsters are graded as new-shell, hard-shell, or old-shell. Because lobsters that have recently shed their shells are the most delicate, an inverse relationship exists between the price of American lobster and its flavor. New-shell lobsters have paper-thin shells and a worse meat-to-shell ratio, but the meat is very sweet. However, the lobsters are so delicate that even transport to Boston almost kills them, making the market for new-shell lobsters strictly local to the fishing towns where they are offloaded. Hard-shell lobsters with firm shells but less sweet meat can survive shipping to Boston, New York, and even Los Angeles, so they command a higher price than new-shell lobsters. Meanwhile, old-shell lobsters, which have not shed since the previous season and have a coarser flavor, can be air-shipped anywhere in the world and arrive alive, making them the most expensive.

Killing methods and animal welfare 

Several methods are used for killing lobsters. The most common way of killing lobsters is by placing them live in boiling water, sometimes after being placed in a freezer for a period. Another method is to split the lobster or sever the body in half lengthwise. Lobsters may also be killed or immobilized immediately before boiling by a stab into the brain (pithing), in the belief that this will stop suffering. However, a lobster's brain operates from not one but several ganglia, and disabling only the frontal ganglion does not usually result in death. The boiling method is illegal in some places, such as in Reggio Emilia, Italy, where offenders face fines up to €495. Lobsters can be killed by electrocution prior to cooking with a device called the CrustaStun. The Swiss government banned boiling lobster live without stunning them first. Since March 2018, lobsters in Switzerland need to be knocked out, or killed instantly, before they are prepared. They also receive other forms of protection while in transit.

Fishery and aquaculture 

Lobsters are caught using baited one-way traps with a color-coded marker buoy to mark cages. Cages are of plastic-coated galvanized steel or wood. A lobster fisher may tend to as many as 2,000 traps.

Around the year 2000, owing to overfishing and high demand, lobster aquaculture expanded. However, as of 2008, no lobster aquaculture operation had achieved commercial success, mainly because of lobsters' tendency towards cannibalism and the slow growth of the species.

Species 

The fossil record of clawed lobsters extends back at least to the Valanginian age of the Cretaceous (140 million years ago). This list contains all extant species in the family Nephropidae:

Acanthacaris
Acanthacaris caeca A. Milne-Edwards, 1881
Acanthacaris tenuimana Bate, 1888
Dinochelus Ahyong, Chan & Bouchet, 2010
Dinochelus ausubeli Ahyong, Chan & Bouchet, 2010
Eunephrops Smith, 1885
Eunephrops bairdii Smith, 1885
Eunephrops cadenasi Chace, 1939
Eunephrops luckhursti Manning, 1997
Eunephrops manningi Holthuis, 1974
Homarinus Kornfield, Williams & Steneck, 1995
Homarinus capensis (Herbst, 1792) – Cape lobster
Homarus Weber, 1795
Homarus americanus H. Milne-Edwards, 1837 – American lobster
Homarus gammarus (Linnaeus, 1758) – European lobster
Metanephrops Jenkins, 1972
Metanephrops andamanicus (Wood-Mason, 1892) – Andaman lobster
Metanephrops arafurensis (De Man, 1905)
Metanephrops armatus Chan & Yu, 1991
Metanephrops australiensis (Bruce, 1966) – Australian scampi
Metanephrops binghami (Boone, 1927) – Caribbean lobster
Metanephrops boschmai (Holthuis, 1964) – Bight lobster
Metanephrops challengeri (Balss, 1914) – New Zealand scampi
Metanephrops formosanus Chan & Yu, 1987
Metanephrops japonicus (Tapparone-Canefri, 1873) – Japanese lobster
Metanephrops mozambicus Macpherson, 1990
Metanephrops neptunus (Bruce, 1965)
Metanephrops rubellus (Moreira, 1903)
Metanephrops sagamiensis (Parisi, 1917)
Metanephrops sibogae (De Man, 1916)
Metanephrops sinensis (Bruce, 1966) – China lobster
Metanephrops taiwanicus (Hu, 1983)
Metanephrops thomsoni (Bate, 1888)
Metanephrops velutinus Chan & Yu, 1991
Nephropides Manning, 1969
Nephropides caribaeus Manning, 1969
Nephrops Leach, 1814
Nephrops norvegicus (Linnaeus, 1758) – Norway lobster, Dublin Bay prawn, langoustine
Nephropsis Wood-Mason, 1872
Nephropsis acanthura Macpherson, 1990
Nephropsis aculeata Smith, 1881 – Florida lobsterette
Nephropsis agassizii A. Milne-Edwards, 1880
Nephropsis atlantica Norman, 1882
Nephropsis carpenteri Wood-Mason, 1885
Nephropsis ensirostris Alcock, 1901
Nephropsis holthuisii Macpherson, 1993
Nephropsis malhaensis Borradaile, 1910
Nephropsis neglecta Holthuis, 1974
Nephropsis occidentalis Faxon, 1893
Nephropsis rosea Bate, 1888
Nephropsis serrata Macpherson, 1993
Nephropsis stewarti Wood-Mason, 1872
Nephropsis suhmi Bate, 1888
Nephropsis sulcata Macpherson, 1990
Thaumastocheles Wood-Mason, 1874
Thaumastocheles dochmiodon Chan & Saint Laurent, 1999
Thaumastocheles japonicus Calman, 1913
Thaumastocheles zaleucus (Thomson, 1873)
Thaumastochelopsis Bruce, 1988
Thaumastochelopsis brucei Ahyong, Chu & Chan, 2007
Thaumastochelopsis wardi Bruce, 1988
Thymopides Burukovsky & Averin, 1977
Thymopides grobovi (Burukovsky & Averin, 1976)
Thymopides laurentae Segonzac & Macpherson, 2003
Thymops Holthuis, 1974
Thymops birsteini (Zarenkov & Semenov, 1972)
Thymopsis Holthuis, 1974
Thymopsis nilenta Holthuis, 1974

See also 

 Gérard de Nerval, a French writer who kept a lobster as a pet
 Lobster War, an early-1960s diplomatic conflict between Brazil and France over spiny lobster fishing territories
Lobstering, an innate escape mechanism in marine and freshwater crustaceans

Notes

References

Further reading

External links 

 
 Atlantic Veterinary College Lobster Science Centre

Animal-based seafood
Articles containing video clips
Commercial crustaceans
Edible crustaceans
Negligibly senescent organisms
Seafood
Taxa named by James Dwight Dana
True lobsters
Extant Valanginian first appearances